Eduard Shemetylo (born 14 August 1990) is a Ukrainian sprint canoer and marathon canoeist. He is a silver medalists of the World Championships and medalist of the European Championships.

References

External links
Ukrainian Canoe Federation

Ukrainian male canoeists
Living people
ICF Canoe Sprint World Championships medalists in Canadian
1990 births
Universiade medalists in canoeing
Universiade gold medalists for Ukraine
Universiade silver medalists for Ukraine
Medalists at the 2013 Summer Universiade
Sportspeople from Poltava
21st-century Ukrainian people